Liviu Totolici (born 1 January 1969) is a Romanian former water polo player who competed in the 1996 Summer Olympics.

References

1969 births
Living people
Romanian male water polo players
Olympic water polo players of Romania
Water polo players at the 1996 Summer Olympics